is a historic Japanese distance marker akin to a milestone, consisting of an earthen mound located in the Nomura neighborhood of the city of Kameyama, Mie Prefecture in the Kansai region of Japan. It was designated a National Historic Site of Japan in 1934.

Overview
During the Edo period Tokugawa shogunate established ichirizuka on major roads, enabling calculation both of distance travelled and of the charge for transportation by kago or palanquin. These markers were a pair earthen mounds and denoted the distance in ri to Nihonbashi, the "Bridge of Japan", erected in Edo in 1603. They were typically planted with an enoki or Japanese red pine to provide shelter for travelers. Since the Meiji period, most of the ichirizuka have disappeared, having been destroyed by the elements, modern highway construction and urban encroachment. In 1876, the "Ichirizuka Abolition decree" was issued by the Meiji government and many were demolished at that time. Currently, 17 surviving ichirizuka are designated as national historic sites.

The Nomura ichirizuka is located on the Tōkaidō highway connecting Kyoto with Edo. It was completed in 1604. It is located to the west of Kameyama Castle and is located 106 ri 12 chō from Edo, or 17 ri, 32 cho from Kyoto. It is the only survivor of twelve ichirizuka originally in the prefecture. The southern mound was destroyed in 1918,  and currently only the mound on the northern side of the road survives. It is planted with a Muku tree estimated to be 400 years old. Per an 1711 illustrated guide to the Tōkaidō, the southern mound is described as having three enoki trees.  The site is about a 15-minute walk from Kameyama Station on the JR West Kansai Main Line.

See also
List of Historic Sites of Japan (Mie)

References

External links

Kameyama tourist information site 
 Mie Prefecture tourist information site 
Cultural properties of Mie Prefecture 

Ichirizuka
Kameyama, Mie
Historic Sites of Japan
History of Mie Prefecture
Ise Province